Anarbor is an American rock band from Phoenix, Arizona that was formed in 2003. The band is composed of lead vocalist, bassist and only constant member Slade Echeverria, guitarist Adam Juwig, guitarist Danny Stravers, and drummer William Wilson. Initially known as "Troop 101", the band later changed their name to "Anarbor". In April 2008, the band was signed to Hopeless Records while still attending high school in Arizona. Since then, the band has released four EPs and three studio albums.

History
The band started playing together in Garrity's garage in the Phoenix community of Ahwatukee in early 2003. They played their first show on July 17, 2003, at Skateland in Chandler, AZ. Shortly after the band's first show, they added bassist Jess Myers. The band continued to play all over the Phoenix metro area throughout their high school years. In December 2004, the band went into the studio with producer Matt Grabe to record their debut EP, "You Brought This On Yourself", which was released locally in May 2005.

Their self-released EP, Hearing Colours, Seeing Sounds, was released digitally in March 2008 and peaked at No. 62 on Amazon.com's Top Album chart.

Their debut Hopeless Records release, The Natural Way, came out on August 19, 2008. The four song digital release debuted at [ No. 6 on the Billboard Top Singles Album Chart]. In October 2008, Jess Myers announced her departure from the band, due to excessive touring and her interest in going to college.

An acoustic version of Anarbor's song "Passion for Publication" appeared in the compilation Take Action! Volume 9.

The band released Free Your Mind on March 10, 2009.

On April 20, 2010, the band released their first full-length studio album, entitled The Words You Don't Swallow, which peaked at number 50 on Billboards Independent Albums chart  and number 16 on the Heatseekers chart.

On March 8, 2011, the group released an EP of cover songs and remixes entitled The Mixtape.

In 2012 the band released two singles: "Whiskey In Hell (Rough Cut)", which was released on February 7, and "Damage I've Done", released on October 2.

On May 6, 2013, Anarbor announced that their new album would be called Burnout and that it would be released via Hopeless Records on June 4. On the same day they released a lyric video for a new song, "Every High Has a Come Down". On May 14, 2013, Anarbor released a lyric video for another song off of Burnout, titled "Who Can Save Me Now", via the official Hopeless Records YouTube Channel. On May 29, the entire album was uploaded for streaming on YouTube.

On September 20, 2014, The band announced on Twitter that they did not break up, but are "taking a bit of a break". A year later, the band posted on Twitter that they were working on new music.

Throughout early 2016, the band posted on their Facebook that they were in the process of recording and mixing their new album. They announced on April 13 that they had finished the new album.

On July 29, 2016, they released their self-titled album. No longer on Hopeless Records, they released their album independently.

In November 2016 Anarbor went on a US tour supporting Headlining Emarosa along with Cold Collective.

In the month of July 2017 they went on tour with Sundressed, touring the West Coast, Pacific Northwest and parts of the Midwest in the United States.

On July 29, 2017, the band had released an official statement that drummer Tyler Hedstrom had died on Wednesday, July 26, 2017, by suicide at the age of 17. In the events after, the band and family had set a gofundme goal of $15,000 in order to pay for Tyler's funeral expenses. The fundraising was pulled after the band and family had raised over $20,000. The band performed the song, "Pushaway", for the first time at Tyler's memorial service.

Anarbor is still currently making new music. Their latest songs are titled Find a Way, Tangerine, Tasty, and Drugs.

Television
The song "Let the Games Begin" was featured on an episode of MTV's series The Hills. In addition, Anarbor's music is featured daily on ESPN's top-rated show Sports Center.

Anarbor was chosen to write and record the theme song for the Scooby-Doo! The Mystery Begins movie, due out in September 2009. They have filmed a music video, "You and I", which aired on Cartoon Network that showcases the tune, in addition to playing on the movie's trailer. Anarbor's tune "Let the Games Begin" has also been chosen to be the theme song to "Good Day L.A.", a national talk show broadcast from Los Angeles.

"Let the Games Begin" was also featured on the NFL kickoff show, on NBC, during a recap of the 2008–2009 season.

"Let the Games Begin" has also been featured in the episode "Boards of Glory" in Stoked, a hit Canadian cartoon on Teletoon.

"Let the Games Begin" is the theme song for MLB Network Countdown.

Anarbor competed on the MTV comedy "Silent Library" which first aired on July 21, 2010.

"Always Dirty, Never Clean" was featured on Jersey Shore season two, episode one.

"Passion for Publication" and "Let The Games Begin" were also featured on Jersey Shore season two, episode four.

"You And I" was featured on Cartoon Network for the movie "Scooby-Doo The Mystery Begins" as a commercial music video.

"You and I" was also featured in the episode "Brofinger" from Stoked.

Anarbor was featured on the MTV show "10 on Top" which first aired on April 2, 2011.

Band members

Current members
 Slade Echeverria – lead vocals (2003–present), bass guitar (2008–present)
 Adam Juwig – guitar (2003–2012, 2014–present)
 Daniel Stravers – guitar, vocals (2016–present)
 William Wilson – drums (2018–present)

Former members
 Jess Myers – bass guitar (2003–2008)
 Mike Kitlas – guitar, vocals (2003–2013)
 Dave Melillo – guitar (2012–2013)
 Greg Garrity - drums, percussion, vocals (2003–2013, 2014–2016)
 Tyler Hedstrom – drums, percussion (2017; died 2017)

Former touring members
 Justin Bradley - percussion, vocals (2008–2013), guitar, vocals (2013–2014)
 Steven Kopacz - drums, percussion (2013)
 Josh Withenshaw - lead guitar (2013)
 Kyle Rodgers - drums, percussion (2016)
Alex Hedstrom - guitar(2017)
Brandon Simoes - keys(2017)

Tour
 In June 2006, Anarbor went on their first tour on the West Coast leg of the Home Is Where You Make It tour featuring The Scene Aesthetic and Danger:Radio.
 In June 2008, Anarbor toured throughout the West Coast and Midwest with The Summer Set and Eye Alaska.
 In September and October 2008, Anarbor toured the East Coast and Midwest with The Bigger Lights, The Years Gone By and School Boy Humor.
 In December 2008, Anarbor toured the West Coast with The Scenic and TV/TV.
 In February through April 2009, Anarbor toured on the Take Action Tour with Cute Is What We Aim For, Meg and Dia, Breathe Carolina, and Every Avenue.
 In May through June 2009, Anarbor toured with main act Forgive Durden, and You, Me, and Everyone We Know.
 In Summer 2009, they toured with main act The Cab, and The Summer Set, Eye Alaska and The Secret Handshake on the What happens in Vegas Tour.
 In late Summer 2009, they also attended the Warped Tour for four days in July.
 In October 2009, they toured with Straylight Run, Lydia, and Camera Can't Lie.
 In 2009, late-September to early October, Anarbor toured with The Almost, This Providence & The Dares.
 Winter 2010, Anarbor joined The Friday Night Boys, The Ready Set, The Bigger Lights & Great Big Planes on the Once It Hit Your Lips Tour.
 Spring 2010, Anarbor joined This Providence, The Audition (band), & The Bigger Lights on the 'Bout Damn Time Tour.
 Spring 2010, Anarbor was on the Give It A Name Tour in the UK with The Swellers
 Summer 2010, Anarbor was on the Beyond the Blue tour in Japan with Valencia, There for Tomorrow, and Artist vs Poet. The band was on the way to their first show in Osaka when drummer Greg Garrity fell and broke his jaw at a rest stop. The band had to cancel the remainder of the tour dates and fly back home to the United States.
 Summer 2010, Anarbor was on all of the Warped Tour.
 Fall 2010, Anarbor was on tour with VersaEmerge for the Vultures Unite Tour.
 Spring 2011, Anarbor was on tour with A Rocket To The Moon, Valencia, Runner Runner, and Go Radio for the On Your Side Tour.
 Summer 2011, Anarbor was on the Beyond The Blue Tour in Japan with Mayday Parade, The Summer Set, With the Punches and Destine.
 Summer 2011, Anarbor was on the Zumiez Couch Tour for ten dates with Forever The Sickest Kids
 Summer 2011, Anarbor had a cross country Co-Headlining tour with Valencia; Conditions and NGHBRS also performed.
 Winter 2012, Anarbor was on tour with Mayday Parade, We the Kings and The Downtown Fiction for the End of the World Tour 2012.
December 2012, Anarbor toured with NeverShoutNever!, Plug In Stereo and William Beckett
Summer 2013, Anarbor played all of the Warped Tour. They played the #Domo Stage with Tonight Alive and Stick To Your Guns from June 15–20 and June 22-August 4.
February 2014, Anarbor played four dates with Artist vs Poet in California and Arizona.
November 2016, Anarbor performed across the United States with Emarosa and Cold Collective
July 2017, Anarbor went on a headlining tour of the West  Coast, Pacific Northwest and Midwest with Sundressed

Discography

In April 2020, Anarbor announced via Twitter that they would be releasing a new EP ("Tangerine") in May 2020.

External links 

 
 http://www.buzznet.com/anarbor

References

American pop punk groups
Musical groups from Phoenix, Arizona
Alternative rock groups from Arizona
Hopeless Records artists
Musical groups established in 2003